"Kangaroo Court" is a song by American indie pop duo Capital Cities. The song was released as a digital download in the United States on March 27, 2012, and serves as the second single from the duo's debut album In a Tidal Wave of Mystery. It was mainly written by Sebu Simonian with the help of Ryan Merchant.

Music video
Capital Cities members Ryan Merchant and Sebu Simonian co-directed the music video with Carlos Lopez Estrada. The video was released on YouTube on September 5, 2013. The video features appearances from Darren Criss, Shannon Woodward, and Channing Holmes. The story tells of a zebra (Merchant), who has been forbidden from a club called The Kangaroo Court. Attempting entry disguised as a horse, he falls for a lapdog (Woodward). Her date that night, a bulldog (Criss), becomes jealous and send his henchmen to reveals the zebra for who he actually is. The zebra is placed under arrest for his crime and sent to court to face a kangaroo judge (Holmes). He is found guilty immediately and is executed by a lion (Simonian).

A lyric video was published on YouTube on October 29, 2013.

Track listing

Digital download (single)

 "Kangaroo Court" – 3:43

Digital download (EP) 2014  Lion and Zebra sentence on cover image

 "Kangaroo Court"  – 3:22
 "Kangaroo Court"  – 2:57
 "Stayin' Alive" – 4:04
 "One Minute More"* – 3:38
 "Kangaroo Court"  – 4:10
 "Kangaroo Court"  – 4:42

Digital download (EP) 2012  Judge Kangaroo and his hammer on cover image

"Kangaroo Court" – 3:43
"Kangaroo Court" (Shook Remix) – 4:09
"New Town Crier"  original song – 3:22   
"New Town Crier" (Napoleon Remix) – 3:31

Notes

 "One Minute More" is omitted from the April 1, 2014 re-issue of the digital EP.

Remixes
In October 2013, Capital Cities, Fitz and the Tantrums, and DJ Earworm released a mash-up song entitled "Kangaroo League", which combined "Kangaroo Court" with Capital Cities' previous single "Safe and Sound" and Fitz and the Tantrums' "Out of My League", to promote the two groups' joint "Bright Futures" tour.

Charts

Release history

References

2013 singles
Capital Cities (band) songs
Capitol Records singles